This is a List of Justice of the Nigerian courts of appeals arranged in alphabetical order.
The list also reflect one or more Justice of the Supreme Court of Nigeria who had at one time served as Justice of the appeallate courts of Nigeria.

A
Ahmad O. Belgore
A. I. Katsina-Alu
Ayo Salami
Akintola Olufemi Eyiwunmi
Aloma Mariam Mukhtar
Atanda Fatai Williams
Abai Ikwechegh

B
Bode Rhodes-Vivour

C

D
Darnley Alexander 
Dan Onuorah Ibekwe
 Dahiru Musdapher

E

F

G
George Sodeinde Sowemimo

H

I
Idris Legbo Kutigi
Ibrahim Tanko Muhammad
Istifanus Thomas

J
John Afolabi Fabiyi
 John Taylor

K

L

M
Mahmud Mohammed
Mohammed Uwais 
 Mohammed Bello
Mustapha Akanbi

N
Nasir Mamman

O

P

Q

R

S
Suleiman Galadima
Salihu Moddibo Alfa Belgore

T
Taslim Olawale Elias

U
Umaru Abdullahi

V

W
Walter Samuel Nkanu Onnoghen

X

Y

Z
 Zainab Adamu Bulkachuwa

References

Nigerian courts of appeals
Courts of appeal
Justices